Puckett is a surname. It may also refer to:

 Puckett, Mississippi, United States, a village
 Puckett Observatory, a private observatory in Georgia, United States
 Puckett Gliderport, a privately owned public-use glider airport in Bedford County, Tennessee, United States
 32096 Puckett, an asteroid